Sakuntala Narasimhan (born 30 December 1939) is an Indian journalist, consumer rights activist, and classical vocalist from the Rampur-Sahaswan gharana of Hindustani classical music. She was a disciple of Hafeez Ahmed Khan and is the only vocalist in India to have performed in the National Programme of Music organized by Doordarshan and All India Radio in both Carnatic and Hindustani styles. She was trained in Carnatic classical music by vocalists Musiri Subramania Iyer and Thanjavur Brinda. She is also the only artiste doing a “self-jugalbandi” juxtaposing the two styles.

Early life and education
Sakuntala holds a MA degree in Economics and postgraduate degrees in classical music. She has two doctorates – one in women's studies and another in musicology. She lived in Delhi during 1947 when India became independent, around the time of partition of India, then moved to Mumbai and currently lives in Bengaluru. Her doctoral thesis in musicology was on a comparative study of the Carnatic and Hindustani styles. Sakuntala started performing at an early age for All India Radio and has been a performing artist for the past 60 years for SPIC MACAY and several other organizers.

Career
As a journalist, Sakuntala worked for 7 years with The Times of India group at Mumbai. She reported on the U.N. Global Conference on Women in China, for the Deccan Herald in 1995, and on the 23rd UN General Assembly session at New York in 2000. She was also one of four Indian journalists selected to attend and write about the World Summit on Sustainable Development in South Africa in 2002. Her columns ran in the Deccan Herald for 27 years until 2009 and she currently writes for The Wire, Citizen Matters, and Moneylife.

Sakuntala taught music at the Bombay University and has taught journalism, women's studies, and economics at the Bangalore University at the postgraduate level. She has also taught in the United States on a Fulbright fellowship. She has presented papers at international conferences on media, music and feminist studies, in the United States, Britain, Norway, Pakistan, Kenya, Uganda, the Philippines, Indonesia, Japan, Thailand, and Australia.

Awards
AIR awards in Thumri and Khayal in 1957 and 1958
5 Gyan Samaj Music Academy Awards, Madras in 1980s
Chameli Devi Jain Award for Outstanding Women Mediapersons in 1983
‘Journalism for Human Rights’ Award by People's Union for Civil Liberties in 2000
Karnataka Rajyotsava Awards in 2016

Works
She has published around 4,000 articles for various news outlets and journals and authored 11 books, on consumer rights, music and feminist issues. Her writings have been translated into Russian, German, Swedish, Japanese, Hindi, Tamil, Malayalam, Kannada, and Telugu. Below are some of her selected writings and books:
 Sakuntala Narasimhan, Born unfree: a selection of articles on practices and policies affecting women in India. NMKRV, First Grade College for Women, 1989.
 Sakuntala Narasimhan, Sati: Widow Burning in India. HarperCollins India, 1998. . 
 Sakuntala Narasimhan, Kamaladevi Chattopadhyay: The Romantic Rebel. New Dawn Books, 1999. . 
 Sakuntala Narasimhan, Empowering Women: An Alternative Strategy from Rural India. SAGE Publications Pvt. Ltd, 1999. . 
 Sakuntala Narasimhan, The splendour of Rampur-sahaswan gharana of Hindustani music, its evolution, history, characteristics and compositions. Veenapani Centre for Arts, 2006.

References

External links
WorldCat
The Economic and Political Weekly

Hindustani singers
1939 births
Living people
People from Bangalore
Indian women classical singers
Indian musical theatre composers
20th-century Indian singers
Women Hindustani musicians
Musicians from Karnataka
20th-century Indian women singers
21st-century Indian women singers
21st-century Indian singers
21st-century Indian composers
Women musicians from Karnataka
Indian women journalists
Narasimhan family